Gilla may refer to:

People

Irish masculine given name
  (fl. 1072)
  (died 1084)
  (died 1143)
  (died 1153)
  (died 1172)
  (died 1204)
  (died 1224)
  (died 1301)
  (died 1405), Irish musician
  (died 1442), Lord of Iar Connacht and Chief of the Name
  (1583–1650)

Hebrew feminine given name
Gilla Gerzon

Stage name
Gilla (singer) (born 1950), stage name of an Austrian disco-era singer

Places 
 Gilla, Queensland, a locality in the Toowoomba Region, Queensland, Australia

See also
Gila (disambiguation)
Gill (disambiguation)
Gilli (disambiguation)